This is a list of seasons played by seven-time European champion and fifteen-time French champion Olympique Lyonnais Féminin, a women's football club. The team was created in 1970 and was FC Lyon's women's section for over three decades before switching to Olympique Lyonnais starting from the 2004–05 season.

Key
 R16 = Round of 16
 QF = Quarter-finals
 SF = Semi-finals
  = Runners-up (cup competitions)
  = Winners
  = Runners-up (in the league)
  = Champions

Seasons

Notes

References

seasons
 
Olympique Lyonnais Women
Olympique Lyonnais